Dr. Roscius P. and Mary Mitchell Thomas House and Outbuildings, also known as the Ruth Thomas Home Farm, is a historic home located near Bethlehem, Hertford County, North Carolina.  The house was built in 1887, and is a two-story, three-bay, single-pile, side-gable roof, Late Victorian style frame dwelling with a two-story, gable-roof rear ell. Built into the ell is a Greek Revival style kitchen building.  The house is sheathed in weatherboard, sits on a brick foundation, and has a one-story half-hip roof porch.  Also on the property are the contributing doctor's office (c. 1855), smoke house (c. 1855), and root cellar (c. 1855).

It was listed on the National Register of Historic Places in 2007.

References

Houses on the National Register of Historic Places in North Carolina
Greek Revival houses in North Carolina
Victorian architecture in North Carolina
Houses completed in 1887
Houses in Hertford County, North Carolina
National Register of Historic Places in Hertford County, North Carolina